Persian Sea may refer to:

 Arabian Sea, a sea in the Indian Ocean bordering the Arabian Peninsula, India, Iran, and Pakistan
 Persian Gulf, a gulf between the Arabian Peninsula and Iran
 Gulf of Oman, a gulf between the Arabian Sea and Persian Gulf
 Erythraean Sea, an obsolete term for waters in and near the Gulf of Aden

See also
 Persian Gulf naming dispute, concern since the 1960s with the name of the body of water between the Arabian Peninsula and Iran
 Persian Gulf (disambiguation)